Orbicella franksi, commonly known as boulder star coral, is a colonial stony coral in the family Merulinidae. It is native to shallow waters in the Caribbean Sea, the Gulf of Mexico, the Bahamas, Bermuda and Florida, and is listed as a "vulnerable species" by the International Union for Conservation of Nature.

Taxonomy
Until recently this coral, along with Orbicella faveolata, was thought to be a variety of Orbicella annularis. There is very little morphological differences between them but studies have shown differences in corallite structure, life history, allozymes and distribution. All three members of this species complex used to be placed in the genus Montastraea.

Description
Colonies of Orbicella franksi usually form massive clumps with uneven surfaces, but sometimes forms plates, and in shady positions, may be encrusting. The general colour is orange-brown, greenish-brown or greyish-brown, but the extremities of the lumps are often pale or white. The growing edges of this coral bear both large and small corallites which is in contrast to the closely related Orbicella faveolata, which has regularly spaced corallites at its growing edges.

Distribution and habitat
Orbicella franksi is native to the Caribbean Sea and the Gulf of Mexico, including Florida, the Bahamas and Bermuda.

Status
Orbicella franksi seems to be more resistant to coral diseases than some members of its genus, but is still susceptible to coral plague, yellow-band disease, black band disease and coral bleaching. The major threats it faces include climate change, ocean acidification and destruction of its reef habitat. The International Union for Conservation of Nature has rated its conservation status as being near threatened.

References

Merulinidae
Coral reefs
Animals described in 1895
ESA threatened species
Taxobox binomials not recognized by IUCN